Government Senior Secondary School, also known as GSSS, in Meethari Marwar Tehsil Ladnun, Rajasthan, is a boarding school in India. Earlier it was known as Darbar Lower Primary School Hindi School. It is one of the oldest schools in Nagaur district.

History

GSSS was established in 1929. The school, the oldest Shree Darbar Lower Primary Hindi School, was started as a Pathshala in 1929 by the Maharaja of Jodhpur for the education of the poor pupils of the village. Raised to a middle school in 1951 after Indian independence, the school became a pioneer by extending the benefits of education to the people of almost 30 nearby villages and outlying areas. It developed into a high school in 1966 and a senior secondary school in 1995. The school was named as a government senior secondary school.

Affiliation

The school was affiliated to the RBSE. It is managed and run by the State Education Department of Rajasthan and is monitored by the Nagar District Education Officer for Secondary Education. It has permanent recognition for education at 10+2 levels from the Government of Rajasthan and Board of Secondary Education, Rajasthan.

Academics and facilities
The school has approximately 450 students. It has a library. There are classes in years 9 to 12 in three faculties or streams:

 Commerce: Accountancy, Business administration, Economics.
 Science: Physics, Chemistry, Maths (optional)
 Humanities: History, Political Science, Hindi literature.

Curriculum
In the secondary section (classes 9 and 10), English and Hindi, maths, science, and social science are the main subjects along with SUPW (Music/Dance/Art/Craft), games, computer skills, and environmental education.

In the senior secondary section (classes 11 and 12), students choose between Science with Maths, Science with Biology, Commerce with or without Maths, and the Humanities stream with Hindi and English as the two main compulsory subjects. Optional subjects include Mathematics, Informatics Practices and physical education. Work experience, general studies, and health education are offered as compulsory internally assessed subjects with the other five main subjects.

Sports and extracurricular activities 
The school has separate grounds for basketball, football, volleyball, cricket, and athletics. It also offers horse riding, NCC (Naval, Army wings), science, pottery, photography and philately clubs, Scouts and Guides, Cubs and Bulbuls, cultural groups, Social Productive Works and social services, NSS and career guidance.

References

External links
School Facebook page

High schools and secondary schools in Rajasthan
Boarding schools in Rajasthan
Nagaur district
Educational institutions established in 1929
1929 establishments in India